L'album de Noël is a 2000 French language Christmas album by Canadian singer Roch Voisine. He simultaneously released an English language Christmas album entitled Christmas Is Calling.

The album was released in two versions:
Canadian version - contains 14 songs (all in French)
European version - contains 14 songs (3 in English)

Track listing

Canadian version of L'Album de Noël
Joyeux Noël
Marie-Noël 
L'enfant au tambour 
Au royaume du Bonhomme Hiver 
Promenade en traineau 
Noël blanc 
Petit Papa Noël
Sainte nuit 
Mon beau sapin 
Minuit Chrétiens 
23 décembre 
Noël du campeur - 25 juillet

European version of L'Album de Noël
Joyeux Noël 
Marie-Noël 
L’enfant au tambour 
Au royaume du Bonhomme hiver 
Happy Christmas 
Promenade en traîneau 
Noël blanc 
Petit Papa Noël 
Christmas Is Calling 
Sainte Nuit 
Mon beau sapin 
Minuit Chrétiens 
I’ll Be Home For Christmas 
Un simple gars

External links
Roch Voisine Official site Canadian version album page
Roch Voisine Official site European version album page

Roch Voisine albums
2000 Christmas albums
Christmas albums by Canadian artists
Pop Christmas albums